Robert Louis Ciranko (born March 9, 1947) is the current president of the Watch Tower Bible and Tract Society of Pennsylvania (2014–), the principal corporation of Jehovah's Witnesses.

Biography 
Born in March 1947 in Brooklyn, New York, U.S., Ciranko grew up in a Hungarian immigrant family. All four of his grandparents were members of the Jehovah's Witnesses denomination. Ciranko married Ketra Bates in 1978.

Watch Tower Society presidency 
Ciranko replaced Don Alden Adams as president of the Watch Tower Bible and Tract Society of Pennsylvania in 2014. Ciranko is considered a "helper" to the Governing Body, which maintains authority over the Watch Tower Society and related corporations.

References

1947 births
Living people
American Jehovah's Witnesses
Watch Tower Society presidents
People from Brooklyn